

284001–284100 

|-id=029
| 284029 Esplugafrancoli ||  || The Catalan village of Espluga de Francolí, located in the Tarragona province of Spain, known for its extensive cave system || 
|}

284101–284200 

|-bgcolor=#f2f2f2
| colspan=4 align=center | 
|}

284201–284300 

|-bgcolor=#f2f2f2
| colspan=4 align=center | 
|}

284301–284400 

|-bgcolor=#f2f2f2
| colspan=4 align=center | 
|}

284401–284500 

|-bgcolor=#f2f2f2
| colspan=4 align=center | 
|}

284501–284600 

|-bgcolor=#f2f2f2
| colspan=4 align=center | 
|}

284601–284700 

|-bgcolor=#f2f2f2
| colspan=4 align=center | 
|}

284701–284800 

|-bgcolor=#f2f2f2
| colspan=4 align=center | 
|}

284801–284900 

|-id=891
| 284891 Kona ||  || Kona, a district of the Big Island of Hawaii, United States, known for its Kona coffee and for its annually held Ironman World Championship Triathlon || 
|}

284901–285000 

|-id=919
| 284919 Kaçar ||  || Betül Kaçar (born 1983), a Turkish-American astrobiologist and expert on biosignatures and abiogenesis on Earth. She works with the UN Women for the empowerment of women. || 
|-id=945
| 284945 Saint-Imier ||  || Saint-Imier, a Swiss town founded by the hermit St. Imerius in 884 AD || 
|-id=984
| 284984 Ikaunieks ||  || Jānis Ikaunieks (1912–1969), a Latvian astronomer and observer of red giants who founded the Latvian Astronomical Society and the popular science magazine The Starry Sky and was the first director of the Baldone Observatory  || 
|-id=996
| 284996 Rosaparks ||  || Rosa Parks (1913–2005), a civil rights activist from Alabama, known as the mother of the freedom movement. In 1955, she refused to give up her seat to a white passenger on a bus. Her action spurred efforts throughout the United States to end segregation. || 
|}

References 

284001-285000